Linomide (Roquinimex) is a quinoline derivative immunostimulant which increases NK cell activity and macrophage cytotoxicity. It also inhibits angiogenesis and reduces the secretion of TNF alpha.

Linomide has been investigated as a treatment for some cancers (including as adjuvant therapy after bone marrow transplantation in acute leukemia) and autoimmune diseases, such as multiple sclerosis and recent-onset type I diabetes. Several trials have been terminated due to serious cardiovascular toxicity.

Synthesis

Ethyl 2-(methylamino)benzoate is condensed with ethyl malonate. Amine-ester interchange of that compound with N-methylaniline results in formation of the amide linomide.

References

Immunostimulants
2-Quinolones
Quinolinols
Carboxamides
Anilides
3-Hydroxypropenals